William Alleyne (25 December 1860 – 5 September 1910) was a Barbadian cricketer. He played in seven first-class matches for the Barbados cricket team from 1891 to 1895.

See also
 List of Barbadian representative cricketers

References

External links
 

1860 births
1910 deaths
Barbadian cricketers
Barbados cricketers
People from Saint Lucy, Barbados